Braina is an intelligent personal assistant and speech to text dictation application for Microsoft Windows marketed by Brainasoft. Braina uses natural language interface and speech recognition to interact with its users and allows users to use natural language sentences to perform various tasks on their computer. The application can find information from the internet, search and play songs and videos of user's choice, take dictation, find and open files, set alarms and reminders, performs math calculations, controls windows and programs etc. Braina's Android and iOS apps can be used to interact with the system remotely over a Wi-Fi network.

The name Braina is a short form of Brain Artificial. The software adapts to the user's behavior over time to better anticipate needs. The software also allows users to type commands using keyboard instead of saying them. Braina comes in both free and paid version.

The latest update 1.7 comes with a complete rework of both the business model and function of Braina. 

Fee structure: Brainasoft has moved to an upfront fee and pay as you go billing model. You can buy blocks of query's at $15.00, $50.00 or $100.00 once you have paid for the access to the software. This fee applies to all query's including a simple one like "what time is it?"

Function: Braina is no longer an A.i. on your computer. It like Alexa, Google and Apples Ciri is housed on a server under the control of Brainasoft. The current distinguishing factor of Braina over other A.I. is that there is a software download and interface on your computer that is more extensive than other A.I. options. 

Future plc's TechRadar recognized Braina as one of the top 10 free essential software for 2015. Braina comes in two versions: freeware Lite and Pro.

References

Windows software
Applications of artificial intelligence
Natural language processing software
Speech recognition software